North Street is a hamlet two miles (3.2 km) south of Faversham in Kent, England. The hamlet lies on the A251 road immediately south of its crossing of the M2 motorway. It is in the civil parish of Sheldwich.

Hamlets in Kent